BARS (or "split sphere", transliteration from  abbreviation of , (bespressovaya apparatura vysokogo davleniya «razreznaya sfera»), "press-free high-pressure setup «split sphere»") a high-pressure high-temperature apparatus usually used for growing or processing minerals, especially diamond and boron nitride.

The BARS technology was invented around 1989–1991 by the scientists from the Institute of Geology and Geophysics of the Siberian Branch of the Academy of Sciences of the USSR. In the center of the device, there is a ceramic cylindrical reaction cell of about 2 cm3 in size. The cell is placed into a cubic-shaped pressure-transmitting material, which is pressed by elements made from cemented carbide (VK10 hard alloy). The outer octahedral cavity is pressed by 8 steel sectors. After mounting, the whole assembly is locked in a disc-type barrel with a diameter ~1 meter. The barrel is filled with oil, which pressurizes upon heating; the oil pressure is transferred to the central cell. The central cell is heated up by a coaxial graphite heater. Temperature is measured with a thermocouple. The exterior size is 2.2 х 1.0 х 1.2 meters. Claimed energy consumption is in between 1.5 - 2 kWh.

See also 

 Synthetic diamond
 Material properties of diamond
 Crystallographic defects in diamond
 Diamond color
 Diamond enhancement
 Diamond

References

External links 

hpht – high pressure high temperature
Pressless High-Pressure Equipment “SPLIT SPHERE"
Synthetic threat to gem quality diamonds

Industrial processes
Soviet inventions
Superhard materials
Synthetic diamond
Diamond industry in the Soviet Union